"A Brighter Beat" is a song by Scottish singer-songwriter Malcolm Middleton, from his 2007 third album, A Brighter Beat. It was his fourth single overall, and his first single from A Brighter Beat, released in the UK on 22 January 2007 on Full Time Hobby.

Overview
Malcolm Middleton commented on the song:

Track listing
Songs, lyrics and music by Malcolm Middleton.
7-inch single (FTH032S)
"A Brighter Beat" – 3:49
"Point of Light" – 4:58

Personnel
 Malcolm Middleton – vocals, guitar
 Jenny Reeve – vocals
 Barry Burns – piano
 Tony Doogan – producer

Notes

2007 singles
Malcolm Middleton songs
Songs written by Malcolm Middleton
2007 songs